Wilhelm von Rath (1585 – 27 April 1641) was a German scholar and a military officer.  His name, in the dative case (after "von"), may be rendered as "Rathen".

Biography
Rath was born in Klein-Wülknitz, Anhalt, and came from an old noble family. His parents were Hans von Rath and Anna Voigt Rath. Rath enjoyed a Protestant education and was registered at the University of Leipzig starting the summer of 1601. But he eventually left academia for a career in the military, the high point of which was Rath's appointment as the kriegskommissar, the officer appointed to handle financial matters under Prince Ludwig I of Anhalt-Köthen. Rath was married to Dorothea von Hackeborn, who bore him a son, Balthasar Wilhelm von Rath, in 1629.

In the service of Ludwig I throughout the Thirty Years' War until his death, he was appointed commander of the cavalry (January 10, 1627). In recognition of his military professionalism, Ludwig called him “rough” and “tough” when admitting him to the Fruchtbringende Gesellschaft, a society dedicated to the standardization of German.

Rath distinguished himself with his cavalry at the Battle of Breitenfeld (1631) in the Swedish-Protestant victory against the Imperial Catholic troops.  He was known for his battle cry, an earlier and more poetic version of “When things get tough, the tough get going":
Wan das rauhe ist dahin
So die iugent mit sich bringet:
Endert sich der gantze sinn,
Und dan nach dem himmel ringet.

Rath was killed by war-time marauders near Wieskau, Anhalt-Köthen.

References
This article is based in part on material from the German Wikipedia.

1585 births
1641 deaths
People from Köthen (Anhalt)
German Lutherans
German untitled nobility
17th-century German military personnel
German people of the Thirty Years' War
People from Anhalt-Köthen
Military personnel of the Holy Roman Empire